Table View is a West Coast suburb of Cape Town, South Africa, named after its view of Table Mountain. It has expanded rapidly since the 1970s and has extensions such as Flamingo Vlei, Sunridge, West Riding, Parklands, and Killarney. Table View has various shopping malls, such as Bayside Mall and Table Bay Mall.

Table View beach 

Table View's beach is located along the seafront road. It has numerous parking spots, which are home to local entrepreneurs selling items such as carved animals. The beach stretches both north and south, making it a common place for long jogs or walks. On windy days one can see local people flying coloured kites of different forms and sizes.

During the day, life revolves around the beach with kitesurfing, surfing, stand-up paddle boarding, running, and cycling proving popular with locals. Many international visitors come to Table View in the summer seasons to partake in Kitesurfing. The coastline boasts one of the best along the region for kitesurfers seeing an annual string of competition events such as Red Bull King of the Air and many more.

Table View accommodation 

The Southern Entrance to Table View on the R27 is marked by the Dolphin Beach hotel, a popular holiday resort. A growing number of accommodation suppliers have sprung up over the years in Table View and surrounds. Lodging for BnBs, apartment complexes, and self-catering and backpacker (or hostels) accommodation has also seen some growth in recent years. As accommodation has become highly competitive thus the general quality of the Table View accommodation suppliers in the suburb has increased rapidly. Many kitesurfers and cultural travelers looking for summertime beach and wind along with cultural experiences are turning to budget-friendly boutique backpackers' accommodation in the area of Blouberg or Table View.

Education 
Table View's primary public schools are Table View Primary School and Table View High School.
Nearby suburbs such as Sunningdale boast private schools such as Elkanah, Generations, and Parklands College.

The German International School Cape Town provides bus services from Table View to its main campus in Tamboerskloof.

References

See also
Table View High School
Table View Primary School

Suburbs of Cape Town